Frederick Brown (April 7, 1935 – November 9, 2003) was an American sound editor. He was nominated for the film Rambo: First Blood Part II at the 58th Academy Awards in the category of Best Sound Editing.

He received the Career Achievement Award at the Motion Picture Sound Editors awards in 2002. He also received an Emmy Award for the made-for-TV film The Red Pony.

He had over 70 credits in TV and film.

References

External links

American sound editors
1935 births
2003 deaths
People from Los Angeles
Emmy Award winners